Symphyotrichum prenanthoides (formerly Aster prenanthoides) is a species of flowering plant in the family Asteraceae known by the common name crookedstem aster. It is native to northcentral and northeastern North America.

This rhizomatous perennial herb produces colonies of plants with stems that may exceed  in length. These stems grow upright to erect and may be crooked or nearly straight, often becoming thick and purple with age. The leaves vary in size and shape. The flower heads are borne in branching arrays on purplish stems. The ray florets are lavender or blue in color, or sometimes white. At the center are disk florets in shades of cream and yellow to purple or brown.

This plant grows in many habitats, including woody and marshy areas as well as roadsides.

Conservation
It is a special concern species in Connecticut, where it is believed to be extirpated.

Uses
The Iroquois use this plant medicinally to treat fevers in babies and for other ailments.

Citations

References

prenanthoides
Flora of Ontario
Flora of the North-Central United States
Flora of the Northeastern United States
Flora of the Southeastern United States
Plants used in traditional Native American medicine
Plants described in 1803
Taxa named by Gotthilf Heinrich Ernst Muhlenberg